Alessio Donnarumma (born 16 February 1998) is an Italian football player. He plays for Benevento.

Club career
He started his youth career with Benevento, before switching to Inter in 2012. In 2016 he returned to Benevento.

He made sporadic bench appearances for Benevento's senior squad in 2016–17 Serie B and 2017–18 Serie A, but did not see any field time.

On 9 July 2018 he joined Serie C club Vibonese on a season-long loan. He made his Serie C debut for Vibonese on 16 September 2018 in a game against Bisceglie as a starter and was substituted at half-time.

On 15 July 2019, he joined Picerno in Serie C on loan.

International
In 2014, during his time with Inter, he was called up for several friendlies to the Italy national under-16 football team.

References

External links
 

1998 births
Sportspeople from the Province of Naples
Living people
Italian footballers
Association football midfielders
Italy youth international footballers
Benevento Calcio players
U.S. Vibonese Calcio players
Serie C players
Footballers from Campania